U.S. Route 283 is a spur of U.S. Route 83.  It currently runs for 731 miles (1,175 km) from Brady, Texas at U.S. Route 87 to Lexington, Nebraska at U.S. Route 30. It passes through the states of Texas, Oklahoma, Kansas, and Nebraska.

Route description

Texas

Oklahoma
US-283 enters Oklahoma from Texas in rural Jackson County at a crossing of the Red River.  It runs concurrently with State Highway 5 for several miles past Elmer and continues north to Altus, the largest Oklahoma town on the route.  At the intersection of U.S. Highway 62 in Altus, SH-5 splits off and 283 joins with State Highway 6 for the next  before it takes a western bend to the town of Mangum.  The route continues northwesterly until it crosses I-40 at Sayre.

Through northwestern Oklahoma, US-283 passes through very sparsely populated areas and is the main north–south traffic corridor. After passing through Cheyenne, 283 meanders through Black Kettle National Grassland then crosses the Canadian River. It continues north to Arnett where it joins with State Highway 51 west for  then turns north again passing through Shattuck and Laverne following part of State Highway 15 along the way.

Some points of interest along US-283 in Oklahoma include the Museum of the Western Prairie in Altus; the Old Greer County Museum in Mangum; Black Kettle National Grassland and the Washita Battlefield National Historic Site near Cheyenne and the Shattuck Windmill Museum.

Kansas

US-283 enters from Oklahoma south of Englewood in Clark County, and passes through largely unpopulated areas of the county until joining up for a brief concurrency with U.S. Route 160. Following the split, US-283 continues north through Minneola before making its way into Dodge City, the only town with a population of more than 3,300 the highway passes through in the Sunflower State.

At Dodge City, US-283 jogs east. It meets with U.S. Route 400, but the two highways do not stay joined for long; US-400 splits and heads southeast towards Greensburg, while US-283 continues eastbound past the Dodge City Regional Airport. After passing the airport, the route then bends northeast before joining U.S. Route 50 and U.S. Route 56 for a brief stint.

US-50 and US-56 split east towards Kinsley, and US-283 resumes a due northerly course through open fields before reaching Jetmore, where K-156 crosses in an east–west direction. K-156 heads to Garden City westbound and Great Bend eastbound. The highway continues on another stretch through sparsely populated farmland before reaching Ness City and K-96, the first of two junctions in Ness County. The other junction in the county is at K-4 near Ransom.

The highway reaches Interstate 70 in WaKeeney, and makes a brief jog east through downtown WaKeeney before turning back to the north. US-283 between Ransom and I-70 was closed for much of 2006 as part of a major reconstruction program.

The highway continues north to Hill City, where it crosses U.S. Route 24. The route stays on course until it reaches southern Norton County, where it has a brief concurrency with K-9. At the split, K-9 continues west to Lenora, and US-283 resumes a straight northerly direction until the city of Norton, where after crossing U.S. Route 36, it reaches Nebraska  later.

With the exception of small sections in Dodge City, all portions of US-283 in Kansas are two-laned.

Nebraska
U.S. Highway 283 enters Nebraska south of Arapahoe.  At Arapahoe, US 283 meets U.S. Highway 6 and U.S. Highway 34.  It continues north through Elwood, then turns northeast.  Near Lexington, US 283 crosses the Platte River and intersects Interstate 80.  It continues north into Lexington as a divided highway, turns back to a 2 lane road, crosses the Union Pacific railroad tracks via an overpass, and after taking 2 right turns on city streets, it ends at an intersection with U.S. Highway 30.

Major intersections
Texas
  northwest of Brady
  in Santa Anna. US 67/US 283 travels concurrently through Santa Anna. US 84/US 283 travels concurrently to Coleman.
  in Baird
  in Albany. The highways travel concurrently through Albany.
  south of Throckmorton. The highways travel concurrently to Vernon.
  in Throckmorton
  south-southwest of Seymour. The highways travel concurrently to Mabelle.
  north-northeast of Seymour. The highways travel concurrently to Mabelle.
  in Vernon
Oklahoma
  in Altus
  in Sayre
  east of Arnett. The highways travel concurrently to west of Arnett.
  south-southeast of Laverne
  east of Rosston. The highways travel concurrently to northwest of Rosston.
Kansas
  north of Englewood. The highways travel concurrently to south-southeast of Minneola.
  in Minneola
  south of Dodge City. US 283/US 400 travels concurrently to Dodge City.
  east-northeast of Dodge City. The highways travel concurrently to west-southwest of Wright.
  in WaKeeney
  in Hill City
  in Norton
Nebraska
  in Arapahoe
  south of Lexington
  in Lexington

References

External links

Endpoints of U.S. Highway 283

United States Numbered Highway System
U.S. Highways in Kansas
U.S. Highways in Nebraska
U.S. Highways in Oklahoma
2